Padenia intermedia is a moth of the subfamily Arctiinae. It was described by van Eecke in 1929. It is found on Buru.

References

Lithosiini
Moths described in 1929